Alternate Reality: The City is a video game published by Datasoft, the first game in the Alternate Reality series. It was created by Philip Price, and was released in 1985. Gary Gilbertson created the music.

Technology
The City featured a novel anti-copying technique. The program disks could be copied though the standard methods and the copy would appear to work. However, not long after the player began the game, their character would become weaker and weaker and then die from an apparent disease.

Reception
Scorpia gave Alternate Reality: The City a mixed review in Computer Gaming World. The graphics were praised for its attention to detail, as was the expansive city to explore. She criticized the game, however, for having no goal; once the city is painfully mapped out, the only thing left to do is monotonously battle enemies in preparation for The Dungeon. The 8-bit versions omitted certain features such as joining guilds, and Scorpia criticized the Apple version's poor graphics. In 1993 Scorpia called The City "a fascinating premise that turned out rather poorly ... a game for those with great persistence and patience".

Alternate Reality: The City received a mini-review in 1988 in Dragon #131 by Hartley, Patricia, and Kirk Lesser in "The Role of Computers" column. The reviewers gave the Macintosh version of the game 3 out of 5 stars, and the Atari ST version 3 stars. Alternate Reality: The City and Alternate Reality: The Dungeon were both the subject of the feature review Dragon #135. The reviewers gave Alternate Reality: The City 3 stars, and Alternate Reality: The Dungeon  stars.

Reviews
 Casus Belli #33 (June 1986)

References

External links
Review in Antic
Review in Page 6

1985 video games
Amiga games
Apple II games
Atari 8-bit family games
Atari ST games
Classic Mac OS games
Commodore 64 games
Datasoft games
DOS games
IOS games
Role-playing video games
Single-player video games
U.S. Gold games
Video games developed in the United States